Leila Farsakh (born 1967) is a Palestinian political economist who was born in Jordan and is an Associate Professor of Political Science at University of Massachusetts Boston. Her area of expertise is Middle East Politics, Comparative Politics, and the Politics of the Arab-Israeli Conflict.  Farsakh holds a MPhil from the University of Cambridge, UK (1990) and a PhD from the University of London (2003).

Farsakh conducted post-doctoral research at Harvard's Center for Middle Eastern Studies, and is also a research affiliate at the Center for International Studies at the Massachusetts Institute of Technology.

She has worked with a number of organizations, including the Organisation for Economic Co-operation and Development in Paris (1993 - 1996) and the Palestine Economic Policy Research Institute in Ramallah (1998 - 1999).

In 2001, she won the Peace and Justice Award from the Cambridge Peace Commission in Cambridge, Massachusetts.

Farsakh is the Project Co-Director for Jerusalem 2050, a problem-solving project jointly sponsored by Massachusetts Institute of Technology's Department of Urban Studies and Planning and the Center for International Studies. She has written extensively on issues related to the Palestinian economy and the Oslo peace process, international migration and regional integration.

Farsakh was also a member of the Board at the non-governmental organization RESIST (www.resistinc.org), founded in 1967 to provide grant money and support to grassroots movements advocating for social change.

Selected publications

Books (partial list) 
Palestinian Labour Migration to Israel: Labour, Land, and Occupation (2005). Taylor & Francis Ltd, United Kingdom. .
 Commemorating the Naksa, Evoking the Nakba, (guest editor), Electronic Journal of Middle Eastern Studies, Spring 2008, MIT, Boston, 2008.
Development Strategies, Employment and International Migration, (co-edited with David O’Connor), OECD Development Center Publications, Paris, 1996.
Palestinian Employment in Israel: 1967-1997 (1998). Ramallah.
Rethinking Statehood in Palestine: Self-Determination and Decolonization Beyond Partition (2021). University of California Press.

Articles (partial list) 
“The One State Solution and the Israeli-Palestinian Conflict: Palestinian Challenges and Prospects”, Middle East Journal, vol.64 no.1, winter 2011, pp. 20–45.
 “Introduction – Engaging Islam: Feminisms, Religiosities and Self-Determinations” co-authored with Elora Chowdhury and Rajini Srikanth, International Feminist Journal of Politics, vol. 10, no.4 December 2008, pp. 439–454.
A Legacy of Promise for Muslims, the Boston Globe, co-authored with Elora Chowdhury, 11 September 2007.  
with others: Statement: One country, one state 9 July 2007, Electronic Intifada,
Time for a Bi-National State, March 2007 Le Monde diplomatique (also published in: Israel-Palestine: Time for a bi-national state, 20 March 2007 Electronic Intifada,
The Economics of Israeli Occupation: What is Colonial about it?, 2006
Independence, Cantons, or Bantustans: Whither the Palestinian State? vol.59, no.2, Spring 2005, Middle East Journal
The Political Economy of Agrarian Change in the West Bank and Gaza Strip, Robert Schuman Centre for Advanced Studies Working Paper, European University Institute, 2004.
Israel: An Apartheid State?  November 2003, Le Monde diplomatique
Palestinian Labor Flows to Israel: A Finished Story?, issue 125, Autumn 2002, Journal of Palestine Studies,
The Palestinian economy and the Oslo “Peace Process", the Trans-Arab Research Institute, 2001 
Economic Viability of a Palestinian State in the West Bank and Gaza Strip: Is it Possible without Territorial Integrity and Sovereignty?,   MIT Electronic Journal of Middle East Studies, May 2001
Under Siege: Closure, Separation and the Palestinian Economy  217 - Winter  2000, MERIP

Public lectures
Notes on Analogy: Israel and Apartheid, at the Center for Middle Eastern Studies at Harvard University, 16 March 2007.
Beyond Apartheid in Israel/Palestine: The Reality on the Ground & Lessons from South Africa, at Northeastern University in Boston, 19 November 2006.
"Palestinian Labor Flow to Israel: Is it Over?", at the Center for Middle Eastern Studies at Harvard University, 19 February 2002.
Palestinian Perspective, Chomsky Lecture on Middle East Crises, December 14, 2000

References

External links
The Deteriorating Political Economy of Palestine A video interview with Leila Farsakh,  interview conducted by Saul Landau on "Hot Talk" radio Cal Poly Pomona, March 15, 2004.
Leila Farsakh published works at Department of Political Science - University of Massachusetts Boston

1967 births
Living people
Alumni of the University of London
Harvard University alumni
Alumni of the University of Cambridge
Palestinian political scientists
Political science educators
Palestinian women writers
Palestinian women academics
University of Massachusetts Boston faculty
20th-century Palestinian women writers
20th-century Palestinian writers
21st-century Palestinian women writers
21st-century Palestinian writers
Women political scientists